Charles Geoffrey Hayes (13 March 1942 – 30 September 2018) was an English television presenter and actor. He presented Thames Television's children's show Rainbow from 1973 to 1992.

Early life and education
Hayes had various jobs such as a British Rail booking clerk before attending drama school in Manchester and training as an actor. Hayes' most prominent role was the presenter of Thames Television's children's show Rainbow from 1973 to 1992, replacing original host David Cook. Before this, he worked as an actor, including a recurring role in BBC1's police drama Z-Cars. Hayes also has writing credits for Rainbow and The Great Pony Raid in 1967.

Career
Hayes struggled to find work after Rainbow was cancelled by ITV when the production company, Thames Television, lost its franchise in 1991. He took a job stacking shelves for his local Sainsbury's grocery for four months as he had not yet found an acting job. He spent time as a taxicab driver and then retired some time later. He said that he would like to have done serious acting work after the show ended, but directors could not disassociate him from his role in Rainbow. Hayes starred in a humorous television advert about investing money, making fun of his fall from the top.

Hayes appeared in the video for "I'd Like to Teach the World to Sing" by Oasis tribute band, No Way Sis. He replicated the role of a taxi driver, just as Patrick Macnee had done in the Oasis video for "Don't Look Back in Anger". Hayes also appeared in the all-star line up for the video of Tony Christie with Peter Kay's single "Is This the Way to Amarillo?" In 2002, he was a guest panellist on an episode of Never Mind the Buzzcocks.

Hayes was part of the Walkers Crisps campaign for Monster Munch in 2008. The stated objective of the campaign was to find the missing monster puppets from the original 1980s television advertisements for the snack. In the film clip, he mentions that he has heard from Bungle recently. In September 2015, he was a guest on BBC One's Pointless Celebrities alongside the former Tiswas star Sally James. The pair got through to the final, but did not get a Pointless answer.

Personal life
Hayes married Sarah Williams in 1987. The couple had a son, Tom.

Hayes was a fan of the Scottish football team Dundee United, having lived in the city in the 1960s. Hayes said that he asked the producers of Rainbow to make the Zippy puppet tangerine in colour, to match Dundee United's colours rather than the blue of local rivals Dundee.

He had homes in London and Spain.

Death
Hayes died of pneumonia in hospital on 30 September 2018 aged 76.

References

External links
Geoffrey Hayes at the British Film Institute

1942 births
2018 deaths
Deaths from pneumonia in the United Kingdom
English male television actors
English television presenters
British television presenters
British children's television presenters
People associated with Dundee
People from Stockport
Place of death missing